Prestwick Academy is a state secondary school serving the area of Prestwick, South Ayrshire in Scotland. The school is non-denominational and has a capacity of 1400. Its motto is Per Vias Rectas, Latin for By Straight Paths.

History 
Prestwick Academy was opened in 1902 as a primary school, with one building, known as 'Block 1' after the school expanded. The building was extended in 1910 and 1913 to provide more classrooms as the town of Prestwick developed. At the time, all secondary school children in the area had to attend Ayr Academy for further education.

The school went through major expansion to accommodate secondary pupils in the 1960s and more buildings were constructed with primary children being moved into block 7. For students in the 1950s, those wishing to take exams had to go to Ayr Academy. The school leaving age was raised to 15. To cope with this expansion, block 7 was taken over by the secondary school and primary students were moved to other schools.

In 1972, Kingcase Primary was opened and Prestwick Academy's primary department was closed down. The school leaving age was raised to 16 which again caused overcrowding. Various huts in the school were replaced by the building of 5 new blocks between 1972 and 1974. The new buildings comprised; a new, single storey Science building (Block 6); an Art/Technical/Business Studies Building (Block 5); a new Maths/Home Economics/Modern Languages and Music building (Block 3) and Offices, Staffroom, Assembly Hall (Block 4) and two Gymnasia, a Games hall and Community Suite (Block 2).

New Prestwick Academy 
As part of the Scottish Executive's Public-Private Partnership policy, it was announced that Prestwick Academy would be re-built. Prestwick and Belmont Academy are the only secondary schools in South Ayrshire being fully rebuilt, while Kyle Academy has also undergone renovation.

Construction started in 2006 with Block 7 (Geography, Religious Studies, Behaviour Support and the Dining Hall) being demolished to make room for the new building. All of the new school, apart from the PE facilities, opened for pupils in October 2008. The new Prestwick Academy is a modern, open-spaced building built on three floors.

All buildings of the old school have now been demolished and the construction of the new PE facilities is complete. The full school building – with the exception of the music recording studio – is now open. The construction of the new all-weather pitches took place between August and December 2009.

The construction of the new school, complete with full landscaping and the all-weather pitches, was officially completed at 10:00 pm on 18 December 2009.

The new building is designed as follows.
 Home Economics, Design & Technology, Physical Education, Mathematics, Music, Pupil Support, School Admin.
 English, Modern Languages, Business Education, History & Modern Studies, Geography, Religious Studies.
 Art & Design, Biology, Chemistry, Physics, Computing.

Notable former pupils

 Peter Howson – Internationally acclaimed artist.
 Laura Macdonald – Saxophonist, recording artist & former co-director National Youth Jazz Orchestra.
 Ian Welsh – Chair of Borderline Theatre Company and the Scottish Advisory Committee of the Voluntary Sector National Training Organisation, a board member of Scottish Enterprise Ayrshire, Kilmarnock College, the LIFE project in Drumchapel, the Space Place in Prestwick, and a Director of the Glaisnock House Trust.
 Drew Galloway – Professional wrestler who performs under the alias of 'Drew McIntyre'.
 The MacDonald Brothers – Recording artists & appeared on The X Factor
 James Forrest – First Team Celtic Football Club Player
 Simon Neil – Guitarist and lead vocalist of Biffy Clyro
 Ian Young – Guinness World Record Holder London Marathon
 Alan Forrest – Footballer for Ayr United F.C.

External links 
 Prestwick Academy
 Prestwick Academy's page on Scottish Schools Online

Secondary schools in South Ayrshire
Prestwick